The eleventh season of the Syfy reality television series Face Off (Styled as Face Off All Stars) premiered on January 24, 2017. This season features returning contestants ("All-Stars") from previous seasons.

Unlike previous seasons, the contestants will not compete individually, but instead, will be paired in teams of two. Each team will compete to win immunity during one week, while eliminations will take place the following week. From episode 9 forward, the competition is individual and one contestant is eliminated each week. Cig Neutron was declared the winner on the season's finale. 

Prizes for this season include a Hyundai Veloster and $100,000.

Contestants

Contestant progress
From Week 1-8 the contestants were eliminated as teams. Starting on Week 9, contestants were eliminated individually from their original teams.

Progress Color Key
 The contestant won Face Off.
  The contestant was a runner-up.
 The contestant won a Spotlight or Focus Challenge or The Gauntlet therefore winning immunity.
 The contestant was in the top in the Spotlight or Focus Challenge.
 The contestant was declared one of the best in the Spotlight or Focus Challenge but was not in the running for the win.
 The contestant was in the bottom in the Spotlight or Focus Challenge or in The Gauntlet.
 The contestant was a teammate of the eliminated contestant in the Spotlight Challenge.
 The contestant was eliminated.
‡ The team won an immunity challenge prior to the elimination challenge.

Recurring people
 McKenzie Westmore - Host
 Michael Westmore - Mentor

Judges
 Ve Neill
 Glenn Hetrick
 Neville Page

Episodes

References

External links
 Face Off at Syfy.com

Face Off (TV series)
2017 American television seasons